Hayley Imogen Silver-Holmes (born 18 August 2003) is an Australian cricketer who plays as a right-arm medium bowler and right-handed batter. She plays for the Tasmanian Tigers in the Women's National Cricket League (WNCL) and the Hobart Hurricanes in the Women's Big Bash League (WBBL). She made her senior debut for Sydney Sixers in 2018 at 15 years old, making her at the time the youngest debutant for the team. She was also the captain of the Australian under-15 team, and was selected for the under-19 team as a 14 year old.

References

External links

Hayley Silver-Holmes at Cricket Australia

2003 births
Australian women cricketers
Living people
New South Wales Breakers cricketers
Sydney Sixers (WBBL) cricketers
Hobart Hurricanes (WBBL) cricketers